ATAC S.p.A. (Azienda Tramvie e Autobus del Comune di Roma, EN Tramway and Bus Agency of the City of Rome) is an Italian publicly owned company running most of the local public transportation services, paid parking and incentive parking lots in Rome. More specifically, the company handles, on behalf of Roma Capitale Authority, the entire tramway, trolleybus network and metro lines, as well as most of the bus lines in the city. It also operates, on behalf of the Administrative Region of Lazio, three railways: Roma-Civita Castellana-Viterbo, Roma-Giardinetti and Roma-Lido. ATAC S.p.A., with its 2,200-kilometer-wide public transport network, its over 8,500 busses and 70,000 parking stalls, is currently one of the biggest public transportation companies in Europe and the largest in Italy.

Founded in 1909 as AATM (Autonomous Municipal Tramway Company) in a bid to municipalise public means of transport in Rome, the company was reformed for the first time in 2000, when it was split into two separate components and turned into a mobility agency for the purpose of planning and coordinating public and private mobility in Rome. It was reorganised once again in 2010, when it was joined with the other two companies, Trambus and Met.Ro., both founded in 2000, back then also involved in public transportation in the city. Over the next few years, the company was deprived of some of its branches: Roma Patrimonio, the owner of the company's estate, then put into liquidation, and Roma Servizi per la Mobilità, which subsequently served as mobility agency of the municipality. In 2018 ATAC S.p.A., being under financial distress, was admitted to the procedure of composition with creditors for the purpose of paying the debts it incurred with other companies, authorities, suppliers and credit institutions so as to avoid its failure.

Public transport in Rome before 1909 
Before 1909, public transportation in Rome, in contrast with other services such as waste collection, was not seen as a service that had to be directly provided, for free or upon payment of reduced fares, by public authorities. As a result, the first means of transport in Rome were offered after the beginning of the second half of the 19th century directly by private entrepreneurships, with the provision of carriages similar to those used by post delivery services, towed by either one or two horses and typically called omnibuses.

The first omnibus line in Rome was activated, probably around Jun 1845 as some sources suggest, to connect Piazza Venezia to Saint Paul Outside the Walls. On July 7, 1956, after the inauguration of the railway between Rome and Frascati (which was also the first railway owned by the Holy See), a new omnibus route between Piazza Venezia and the new train station, temporarily based in Porta Maggiore, was rolled out.

In spite of the many peculiarities pertaining to the private management of public means of transport in Rome during the 19th century, it is important to point out that the provision of omnibus lines was strictly regulated by the Holy See, that in fact, to promptly address this matter, issued the "Vehicle and other mean of transport Regulation" on July 30, 1857. According to this document, omnibus drivers had to own a specific license issued by the Municipality of Rome, along with a relevant authorisation provided by the Police General Directorate. In addition to that, omnibuses could only stop in specific areas and squares, also mandated by the ordinance.

The first omnibus service offered in its entirety within the residential area of Rome was inaugurated on February 20, 1866, connecting Piazza del Popolo to St. Peter's Square.

After 1870, when Rome was annexed to the rest of the state as a result of the Breach of Porta Pia, the first regulation concerning public means of transport within the capital was issued by the municipal administration in 1874, regulating the issue of licenses to both carriages (roughly equivalent to modern taxis) and omnibuses, as well as requirements for drivers, their conduct and standard characteristics of vehicles.

This by-law, if a comparison is made with the previous guidance provided by the Holy See, further expanded on the personnel aboard the omnibus. More specifically, it mandated the continuous presence onboard of a servant, apart from the driver. His main duties were "to sit down in the rear of the vehicle and in the designated spot located out of the carriage, provided with a whistle to be used for the purpose of signalling the driver to leave, and with a trumpet or hunting horn so as to advise passengers waiting at the station that the omnibus is either leaving or arriving". The Municipality of Rome also oversaw and had a say in the lines that omnibuses had to follow, as well as in the fares to be paid by passengers. In 1874, only 11 omnibus termini were authorised by the municipality and the vehicles in circulation could be 59 at the most.

A first step towards the municipalisation of public means of transport in Rome was taken in 1876 when the first convention with the "Omnibus Company of Rome" (in Italian, Società Romana degli Omnibus) was signed. The contract, renewed in 1885 and lasting 15 years, accounted for a reduction of fares for passengers, some minor changes to some routes and the implementation of some new lines.

In the meanwhile, Rome was also being strongly influenced by the ongoing wave of technological advancements spreading all over Europe at the time, and evidently also when it came to public transport. As a matter of fact, the first horse-drawn tramway suburban line between Piazza del Popolo and Ponte Milvio was introduced in 1877 by the "Societé Anonime des Tramways et Chemins de Fer Économiques", known as "the Belgian". The main innovation was that the motion of the horse-towed carriage was facilitated by the presence, on the ground, of a metal rail. After a little while, still in 1879, "steam tramways", connecting Rome to Tivoli, also went into service.

The "Omnibus Company of Rome", after the acquisition of tramways and several other routes formerly owned by other entrepreneurships, in 1886 reconstituted itself as the "Roman Tramways and Omnibus Company" (in Italian, Società Romana Tramways e Omnibus), also known as S.R.T.O.

Managing 11 omnibus lines and 9 horse-drawn tramways, S.R.T.O. started experimenting with a new electric tramway that, despite some technical and financial issues which were initially encountered, was successfully introduced within the end of the century, which still appears to be at a much later time than in most other European capital cities. Even though some experimental lines were installed along Via Flaminia out of Porta del Popolo and inaugurated by the king Umberto I of Italy on July 6, 1890, the actual introduction of electric tramways in the city of Rome dates back to 1895, when S.R.T.O. itself activated a line connecting the already-existing line in Termini with St. Silvestro, powered by an aerial cable.

Despite these technological advancements introduced at the turn of the century, several issues still permeated all means of transport handled by S.R.T.O. such as, to name a few, the shortage of vehicles and the high fares that the company could charge its customers being in an almost monopolistic setting, in a city that had already reached the threshold of half a million inhabitants between 1901 and 1911. As a result, in a bid to solve these complexities, the Municipality of Rome took into consideration the municipalisation of all public means of transport in the city.

History 
At the turn of the century, it was already clear that a private management of public means of transport was, in actual facts, beneficial to neither municipalities nor customers. As a matter of fact, the first could not take advantage of the revenues deriving from the service, neither could the latter benefit from lower fares if compared with the ones provided by private companies.

As a result, on March 29, 1903, Giolitti, an Italian politician and former Prime Minister, promoted a law commonly referred to as “Giolitti law on municipalisation” which regulated, for the first time in the history of the Kingdom of Italy, the management of public local services and the municipalisation thereof. This law, with many changes and integrations implemented over the years, is still partially in force after more than a century since its publication, even in the context of the Republic of Italy.

In the light of this newly-come facilitation of the process of municipalisation of a company allowed by the so-called “Giolitti law”, on May 13, 1908 Ernesto Nathan, at the time mayor of Rome, presented to the municipal council of the city a proposal for the “Creation and exercise of new tramway lines by the municipality”. This document didn't only thoroughly present the project and its peculiarities, but it also carried out an insightful analysis of the public transportation history in Rome coming to the foregone conclusion that shortages of services as well as other disruptions were mainly caused by the almost monopoly that the “Roman Tramways and Omnibus Company” (S.R.T.O) had hitherto gained. This proposal would shortly be followed by a more tangible “Municipal Tramway Network Plan” devised by the Technology Assessor Giovanni Montemarini, which was discussed and subsequently unanimously approved on March 20, 1908. After three years, on March 21, 1911, the first line connecting Piazza Colonna to the area of S. Croce was inaugurated.

After a while, by the end of 1908, also a “Municipal Electric Company” replacing the previously privately owned counterpart had been created, so as to provide not only the facilities but also the motor power needed for public means of transport to properly operate at a much lower price for the municipality itself. As a matter of fact, this municipalisation process led to a significant reduction in the price of tickets for members of the working class: a regular tram ticket cost 10 cents - much less than fares provided by S.R.T.O. - which was further reduced to 5 cents for workers between 5 and 8 A.M.

Established in 1909 as AATM (Autonomous Municipal Tramway), the company changed its name almost immediately to A.T.M. (Municipal Tramways Company).

In this regard, it is possible to have an insight into the organisational structure of the company by taking a close look at the regulatory document issued by A.T.M. itself in 1910. According to it, the company was led by a president, along with a so-called administrative commission appointed by the municipal council itself; there was also the important presence of a technical director, typically an engineer selected on the basis of the outcome of a competition, who directed both the administrative and the technical division of the company. Technical services were further subdivided into 5 specific sectors: motion, storage, warehouse, repair shop, maintenance, and traction. The forementioned document also accounted for further requirements such as administrative transparency criteria and social legal protection, principles that lied at the heart of both hirings and fair financial attitude towards workers. To further underpin this aim, the company annually held a course for prospective drivers. When it came to hiring new personnel, the company often required previous working experience as well as a piece of identity proof, along with different study titles depending on the role held by the worker within the company (ranging roughly from elementary school certificates for drivers to high school diplomas, which made for a strict requirement for administrative personnel and accountants). The number of working hours per week was 63, which could further decrease as per the right to obtain further leaves, with a paid day off every 15 days at work, which were to be added to additional 10 guaranteed, paid days off per year. While team leaders and inspectors could receive a daily salary of up to 6 lire, the greatest wage for drivers was 4 lire, whereas the one of a worker could reach 4.50 lire and that of a messenger 3.70 lire.

In 1919, ATM began to gradually absorb SRTO's lines and rolling stock, becoming the dominant transit company in Rome.

In 1926, the Governorate of Rome, which replaced the city, was established. Consequently, ATM changed its name to ATG, and two years later, with the establishment of the first bus lines, the ATG became ATAG (Bus and Tramways Company of the governorate).

On December 21, 1929, the SRTO closed down as it only ran a single line. All of its fleet was transferred to the ATAG, which implemented a radical reform of the network by removing all the tram lines within the city centre and replacing them with buses from 1 January 1930. After the reform the network was structured on a series of radial lines which originated from a circular internal loop and were interconnected by a circular outer loop.

On 8 January 1937, the first two trolleybuses, 137 and 138, came into service in the Flaminio district.

On August 9, 1944, the city returned to its original status, so the ATAG became ATAC. It started to tackle the difficult task of rebuilding the network and the fleet. For the first two years of the post-war period a minimum service was provided by "trucks," and then in February 1947, ATAC restored the first 6 lines. The return to the pre-war network was not achieved until 1948.

In the 1950s, the highway network in Italy expanded, which caused train ridership to decrease.

In July 1972, the last trolleybus line (47) was closed.

In 2000, ATAC underwent further transformation: it has only retained ownership of the facilities, tram and trolleybus and deposits, while selling the task of managing the business to external concessionaires. The management of most of the lines of Rome is assigned to the Tramway, which is wholly owned by the City of Rome. Some private companies have won the public tender for the management of other local lines, mostly peripheral ones.

Tram services

The following tram routes are operated by ATAC. All of them are considered urban routes (U letter and blue sign).

2 Piazzale Flaminio-Piazza Mancini
2P Piazzale Flaminio-Piazza di Porta Maggiore (prolonged route)
3 Roma Trastevere railway station-Valle Giulia
5 Termini-Piazza dei Gerani
8 Casaletto-Piazza Venezia
8P Casaletto-Labicano/Porta Maggiore (prolonged route)
14 Termini-Togliatti
19 Risorgimento/Piazza San Pietro-Piazza dei Gerani

Trolleybus services

Rome's trolleybus services is made up by five lines and is also managed by ATAC.

60 Piazza Venezia-Largo Pugliese (technically not a trolleybus route, but uses the trolleybus equipment in use to route 90)
72 Laurentina-Via Gustavo D'Arpe (actually replaced by bus)
73 Piazzale dell'Agricoltura-Via Gustavo D'Arpe (actually replaced by bus)
74 Laurentina-Via Rita Brunetti
90 Termini-Largo Labia

Underground services

Rome's underground is made up by three lines and is also managed by ATAC.

MA Battistini (Rome Metro)-Termini-Anagnina (Rome Metro)
MB Laurentina (Rome Metro)-Termini-Rebibbia (Rome Metro)
MB1 Laurentina (Rome Metro)-Termini-Jonio (Rome Metro)
MC San Giovanni (Rome Metro)-Monte Compatri-Pantano (Rome Metro)

Urban railways

Rome-Lido railway / ASTRAL
Rome-Civita Castellana-Viterbo railway / ASTRAL
Rome-Giardinetti railway / ATAC

Urban bus services

ATAC and ROMA TPL operates various bus routes around Rome. They are identified as Urban (U), Esatta (E), and Express (X).

0-99

H Termini-Dei Capasso
16 XX Settembre-Costamagna
23 Piazzale Clodio-Pincherle/Parravano
31 Piazzale Clodio-Laurentina
32 Risorgimento/Piazza San Pietro-Saxa Rubra Railway station
33 Piazzale Clodio-Lenin
33D Bravetta/Scrovegni-Montalcini (Scholastic Diverted Route)
34 Circular Route Paola
38 Termini-Porta di Roma
44 Montalcini-Teatro Marcello
46 Piazza Venezia-Monte Mario Railway Station
46B Battistini/Soria-Rosi
49 Piazza Cavour-San Filippo Neri Hospital
52 Circular Route Archimede-Tritone/Fontana di Trevi
52D Circular Route Archimede
53 Circular Route Piazza Mancini-Tritone/Fontana di Trevi
61 Balsamo Crivelli-Villa Borghese/Washington
62 Roma Tiburtina railway station-Traspontina
63 Piazza Monte Savello-Rossellini
64 Termini-Roma San Pietro railway station
66 Termini-Marx
69 Piazzale Clodio-Largo Pugliese
70 Piazzale Clodio-Giolitti
71 Circular Route Roma Tiburtina railway station
75 Indipendenza-Poerio/Marino
77 Circular Route Piazzale Ostiense/Piramide
81 Malatesta-Risorgimento/Piazza San Pietro
82 Circular Route Termini-Nomentana
83 Largo Valsabbia-Partigiani
85 Termini-Arco di Travertino
86 Pelagosa-Canetti
86P Baseggio-Eretum (Prolonged Scholastic Route)
87 Largo Colli Albani-Giulio Cesare/Lepanto
88 Largo Labia-
89 Piazzale Clodio-Bressanone/Sant'Agnese Annibaliano
92 Termini-Marliana
93 Prati Fiscali/Jonio-Monte San Giusto
98 Mazzacurati-Paola

100-199

100 Circular Route Porta Pinciana-Via del Corso
105 Circular Route Parco di Centocelle-Termini
106 Grotte Celoni-Parco di Centocelle
107 Mondavio-Grotte Celoni
111/111F Circular Route Sacco 
113 Circular Route Largo Preneste
115 Circular Route Paola
117 Circular Route Piazza San Giovanni in Laterano
118/118D Circular Route Appia/Via dei Quintili
119 Circular Route Piazza Venezia
128/128L Crocco-Baldelli
135 Salaria/Piombino-Roma Tiburtina railway Station
146 Mombasiglio-Pineta Sacchetti/Gemelli
160 Montagnola-Villa Borghese/Washington
163 Rebibbia-
168 Largo Maresciallo Diaz-Roma Tiburtina railway station
170 Termini-Piazzale dell'Agricoltura 
188 Circular Route Largo Maresciallo Diaz

200-299

200 Piazza Mancini-Prima Porta Railway Station
201 Piazza Mancini-Conti Antonio/Pullè
201D Piazza Mancini-Venezuela/India (Scholastic Diverted Route)
211 Roma Tiburtina railway station-Cimone/Monte Acero
211F Cimone/Monte Acero-Pietralata
213 Cinecittà-Largo Preneste
218 Porta San Giovanni-Ardeatina/Scuola Padre Formato
223 Termini-La Giustiniana Railway Station
226/226D Piazza Mancini-Grottarossa/Istituto Asisium
228 Circular Route Roma Trastevere railway station
230 Moschea/Forte Antenne-Sacro Cuore di Maria/Euclide
235 Largo Labia-Bressanone/Sant'Agnese Annibaliano
246 Cornelia-Malagrotta
246P Cornelia-Castel di Guido-Aurelia (Prolonged Route)
247 Roma Aurelia railway station-Cipro (Rome Metro)
280 Piazza Mancini-Partigiani

300-399

301 Augusto Imperatore-Grottarossa/Istituto Asisium
303 La Giustiniana Railway Station-Prima Porta Railway Station
309 Santa Maria del Soccorso-XXI Aprile/Villa Ricotti
310 Termini-Vescovio
311 Rebibbia-Largo Valsabbia 
313 Torre Maura-Longoni
313D Longoni-Largo Preneste (Scholastic Diverted Route)
314 Largo Preneste-Rotello
319 Circular Route Balsamo Crivelli
334 Grottarossa ATAC Depot-Baseggio
336 Val d'Ala-Quarrata
337 Pelagosa-Via Manzoni/Tor Lupara
338/338D Val d'Aosta/Nomentana Railway Station-Marmorale
339 Circular Route Porro Lambertenghi 
340 Dante da Maiano-Marmorale
340D Dante da Maiano-Eretum (Prolonged Scholastic Route)
341 Ponte Mammolo-Sassofeltrio/Fidene Railway Station
343/343D Ponte Mammolo-Valtournanche
344/344D Eretum-Nuovo Salario Railway Station
349 Circular Route Porro Lambertenghi
350 Ponte Mammolo-Nuovo Salario Railway station
351 Antamoro G./Castellani-Largo Somalia
360 Muse-Zama

400-499

404/404D Rebibbia-San Giovanni in Argentella
409 Arco di Travertino-Roma Tiburtina railway station
412 Adria-Olevano Romano
424 Circular Route Ponte Mammolo
435 Porta di Roma-Val di Lanzo
435D Val di Lanzo-Dante da Maiano
437 Circular Route Rebibbia
441 Roma Tiburtina railway station-Casale Rocchi
443 Circular Route Rebibbia
444 Ponte Mammolo-Bonifacio F.P. 
445 Bologna-Curioni
446 Cornelia-Piazza Mancini
447/447D Circular Route Rebibbia
448 Circular Route Balsamo Crivelli
450 Monti Tiburtini/Pertini-Alessandrino
451 Ponte Mammolo-Cinecittà
490 Cornelia-Roma Tiburtina railway station
492 Cipro (Rome Metro)-Roma Tiburtina railway station
495 Roma Tiburtina railway station-Valle Aurelia

500-599

500 Anagnina-Torre Angela
502 Carnevale-Cinecittà
503 Anagnina-Cinecittà
504 Circular Route Anagnina
505 Circular Route Anagnina
506 Anagnina-Grotte Celoni
507 Anagnina-Grotte Celoni
508 Mondavio-Ponte Mammolo
509 Anagnina-Fosso del Cavaliere/CNR
515 Anagnina-Kennedy/Ciampino railway station
520 Circular Route Cinecittà (Rome Metro)-Rome Ciampino Airport
541 Fillia-Malatesta
542 Piazza delle Camelie-Verano
543 Gardenie-Vertunni/Salcito
544 Bressanone/Sant'Agnese Annibaliano-Parco di Centocelle
545 San Luca Evangelista-Verano
546 Ago/Val Cannuta-Ipogeo degli Ottavi Railway Station
548 Roma Tiburtina railway station-Cinecittà
551 Anagnina-Vigne di Morena
552 Gerani/Rododendri-Policlinico/Tor Vergata
555 Pantano-Ponte di Nona
556 Gardenie-Anagnina
557 Piazza Cardinali-Vignali/Scintu
558 Gardenie-Cinecittà
559 Circular Route Anagnina
590 Risorgimento/Piazza San Pietro-Cinecittà

600-699

628 Baronio-Volpi/
649 Roma Tiburtina railway station-Largo Don Orione
654 Circular Route Campo Farnia
657 Arco di Travertino-Vignali/Scintu
660 Cecilia Metella-Arco di Travertino
663 Cirò-Largo Colli Albani
664 Circular Route Largo Colli Albani
665 Circular Route Piazza San Giovanni in Laterano
669 Circular Route Pincherle/Parravano
670 Circular Route Pincherle/Parravano
671 Arco di Travertino-Nervi/Palazzo Sport

700-799

700 Chianesi-EUR Fermi
701 Lenin-Sabbadino
702 Laurentina-Torre Sant'Anastasia
705 EUR Fermi-Piermarini
706 EUR Fermi-Rotellini
708/708D Agricoltura-Versari
709 EUR Fermi-Timocle
709P Timocle-Massimiliano Massimo (Prolonged Scholastic Route)
710 Carini-Lenin
711 Circular Route Villa Bonelli
712 EUR Fermi-Gioja
713 Circular Route Bosco Arvali
714 Termini-Nervi/Palazzo Sport
715 Teatro Marcello-Tiberio Imperatore
716 Teatro Marcello-Viale Ballarin
718 Circular Route Partigiani
719 Candoni ATAC Depot-Partigiani
720 Circular Route Laurentina (Rome Metro)-Rome Ciampino Airport
721 Circular Route Castello della Cecchignola
723 Circular Route Laurentina
724 Agricoltura-Gadda
731 Valgrisi-Eroi di Rodi
731D Caccioppoli/Doppler-Eroi di Rodi/Console (Scholastic Diverted Route)
762 Circular Route Agricoltura
763 Agricoltura-Castello della Cecchignola
763L Circular Route Agricoltura
764 Agricoltura-Londra
765 Arco di Travertino-Laurentina
765D Laurentina-Grotte d'Arcaccio/Scuole (Scholastic Diverted Route)
766 Millevoi-Roma Trastevere railway station
767 Circular Route Agricoltura
769 Londra-Piazzale Ostiense/Piramide
771 Circular Route America
772 Circular Route EUR Fermi
773 Bosco Arvali-Roma Trastevere railway station
774 Circular Route Montalcini/Ripandelli
775 Piazzale Ostiense/Piramide-Nazzani
777 Agricoltura-Beata Vergine del Carmelo
778 America-Beata Vergine del Carmelo
779 Circular Route Agricoltura
780 Nervi/Palazzo Sport-Roma Trastevere railway station
781 Piazza Venezia-Magliana/Scarperia
786 Reduzzi-Roma Trastevere railway station
786D Roma Trastevere railway station-Dei Capasso (Scholastic Diverted Route)
786F Roma Trastevere railway station-Bosco Arvali (Public Holidays Only)
787 Val Fiorita-Bertasi Bonelli
788 Agricoltura-Caccioppoli
789 America-Cinecittà
789F America-Fosso di Fiorano (Public Holidays Only)
791 Cornelia-Nervi/Palazzo Sport
792 San Giovanni Eudes-Porta San Giovanni
795 Circular Route Valgrisi

800-899

808/808D Dei Capasso-Eiffel
870/870D Paola-Trullo
871 Circular Route Roma Trastevere railway station
881 Paola-Avanzini/Quartiere Incis
889 Ago/Val Cannuta-Mazzacurati
892 Valle Aurelia-Aldobrandeschi

900-999

904/904D Cornelia-Bedeschi
905 Cornelia-Malagrotta
906 Casale Lumbroso/Fontebasso-Valle Aurelia
907 Cornelia-La Giustiniana Railway Station
908/908D Grondona-Gasparri P.
910 Termini-Piazza Mancini
911 Piazza Mancini-San Filippo Neri Hospital
912 Circular Route Montemario Railway Station
913 Augusto Imperatore-Montemario Railway Station
913L Dalla Chiesa-Montemario Railway Station
916/916F Piazza Venezia-Andersen
916D Barellai-Mombasiglio (Diverted Scholastic Route)
980 San Filippo Neri Hospital-Pane A.
981 Candoni ATAC Depot-Cornelia
982 Roma Quattro Venti railway station-XVII Olimpiade
983 Circular Route Cornelia
985 Eugenio Frate-Roma Aurelia railway station
990 Piazza Cavour-Montemario Railway Station
990L Circular Route Cipro (Rome Metro) 
992 Circular Route Ipogeo degli Ottavi Railway Station
993 Cornelia-Ipogeo degli Ottavi Railway Station
998 Ponderano-Montemario Railway Station
999 Circular Route Montemario Railway Station

01-099

01 Circular Route Piazzale Stazione del Lido
01D Circular Route Marianne (Scholastic Diverted Route)
03 Circular Route Altamura/Bertolla
04 Piazzale Stazione del Lido-Villani/Cupole
04B Circular Ostiense/Acilia Railway Station
04D Piazzale Stazione del Lido-Saponaro/Fosso del Dragoncello (Scholastic Diverted Route)
05/05D Idroscalo/Bastimenti-Mar Rosso/Mar Glaciale Artico
05B Ebridi/Mercato-Mar Rosso/Mar Glaciale Artico
06 Piazzale Stazione del Lido-Menippo
07 Cristoforo Colombo Railway Station-Litoranea/Villaggio Tognazzi
08 Antifane/Isola 46-Monti San Paolo/Conforti
09 Circular Route Castel Bolognese/Vitinia Railway Station
011 Circular Route Umberto I/Castello
012 Circular Route Ostiense/Acilia Railway Station
013/013D Nino Taranto-Mellano/Reggiolo
014 Piazzale Stazione del Lido-Antifane/Isola 46
016 Monti San Paolo/Conforti-Antifane/Isola 46
016F Monti San Paolo/Conforti-Torcegno/Castel Porziano (Public Holidays Only)
017 Circular Route Ostiense/Acilia Railway Station
018 Circular Route Umberto I/Castello
020 Circular Route Prima Porta Railway Station
021 Grottarossa/Istituto Asisium-La Giustiniana Railway Station
022 Grottarossa/Istituto Asisium-Prima Porta Railway Station
023 Candoni ATAC Depot-Malagrotta
024 Circular Route Via della Stazione di Cesano-Anguillarese/Asl Casaccia
025 Mombasiglio-Formichi
027 Rivoli-Borgo Ticino
028 San Basilide-Roma Aurelia railway station
029 Largo Sperlonga-Saxa Rubra Railway Station
030 Tragliatella/Civico 225-La Storta Railway Station
031 La Giustiniana Railway Station-Piedicavallo
032 Circular Route La Storta Railway Station
033 Prima Porta Railway Station-Santa Cornelia/Brenna
035 Prima Porta Railway Station-Borgo Pineto
036 La Storta Railway Station-Cesano Borgo
037 Fiesse-Prima Porta Railway Station
039 Salaria/Piombino-Valbondione
040 Ponte Mammolo-Gallesi
040F Ponte Mammolo-Alba Adriatica/Barisciano (Public Holidays Only)
041 Ponte Mammolo-Alba Adriatica/Barisciano
041F Ponte Mammolo-Gallesi (Public Holidays Only)
042 Cerquete/Portocannone-Mondavio
042P Cerquete/Portocannone-Mondavio-San Vittorino (Prolonged Route)
043 Rebibbia-Ortucchio
045 Ortona de’ Marsi-Grotte Celoni
046 Circular Route Anagnina 
047 Circular Route Anagnina
048 Papiri-Betti/Civico 65
049 Bisaccia-Alessandrini
051 Grotte Celoni-Cerquete/Portocannone
051L Grotte Celoni-Mazzolari/Romero (Limited Scholastic Route)
052 Circular Route Pantano
053 Marelli/Necchi-Torrenova/Bitonto
054 Pantano-Colle Mattia
055 Pantano-D'Ascanio
056 Raimondi M.-Roccalumera/Borghesiana
057/057D Circular Route Grotte Celoni
058/058D Ponte Mammolo-Tor Vergata/Medicina
058F Grotte Celoni-Longoni/INPS (Public Holidays Only)
059 Mitelli-Policlinico/Tor Vergata
060 Piazzale Stazione del Lido-Aeroporto di Fiumicino (actually suspended)
062 Baffigo/Mastrangelo-Lungomare Amerigo Vespucci/Lido di Castel Porziano (Summer Seasons Only)
063 Circular Route Ostiense/Acilia Railway Station
065 Altamura/Bertolla-Wolf Ferrari/Bazzini
066 Circular Route Cristoforo Colombo Railway Station
070 EUR Fermi-Cristoforo Colombo Railway Station
071 Circular Route Capelli
071P Capelli-Laurentina (Prolonged Route)
073 Capelli-Strampelli
073P Capelli-EUR Fermi (Prolonged Route)
074 Capelli-Ardeatina/Astrini
074P Capelli-EUR Fermi (Prolonged Route)
075/075D Ponte Mammolo-Tonino Bello
078/078D Caduti Liberazione-Tarantelli
081 Circular Route Sabbadino
086 Circular Route Roma Aurelia railway station
087 Pericoli/Solari-Roma Aurelia railway station
088/088F Della Giovanna I./Zoo Grunwald-Gianicolense/Casaletto
089 Casale Lumbroso/Fontebasso-Portuense/Ex Dazio

C1-C26

C1 Circular Route Montebello Railway Station-Prima Porta Cemetery

Express bus services

0-99

20 Anagnina-Cambellotti
20L Circular Route Anagnina (Limited Route)
30 Piazzale Clodio-Laurentina
40 Termini-Traspontina/Via della Conciliazione
50 Circular Route Termini
51 Circular Route San Giovanni in Laterano-Colosseo-Piazza Venezia-Tritone/Fontana di Trevi
80 Piazza Venezia-Porta di Roma

100-199

120F Recanati-Villa Borghese/Washington (Public Holidays Only)
150F Tonino Bello-Villa Borghese/Washington (Public Holidays Only)
180F Dalla Chiesa-Mazzacurati (Public Holidays Only)
190F Piazza Venezia-Mombasiglio (Public Holidays Only)

Exact bus services

0-999

01-099

C1-C26

C2 Termini-Flaminio Cemetery
C3 Roma Tiburtina railway station-Flaminio Cemetery
C4 Piazzale Stazione del Lido-Flaminio Cemetery
C5 Piazza delle Camelie-Montebello Railway Station
C6 Baldelli-Flaminio Cemetery
C7 Laurentina-Flaminio Cemetery
C8 Baldelli-Laurentino Cemetery
C9 Romanisti/Marforio-San Vittorino
C11 Cinecittà-Laurentino Cemetery
C13 Piazzale Stazione del Lido-Laurentino Cemetery
C19 Piazzale Stazione del Lido-Ostia Antica Cemetery
C26 Anguillarese-Mombasiglio (actually suspended)

Night bus services

Urban railways and underground replacement services

nMA Anagnina-Battistini/Soria
nMB Laurentina-Rebibbia
nMB1 Termini-Jonio
nMC Piazza Venezia-Pantano
nME Piazza Venezia-Cristoforo Colombo Railway Station

Other lines

n551 Circular Route Anagnina
n90 Piazza Venezia-Montegiberto/Piagge
n46 Termini-Monte Mario Railway Station
n913 Piazza Venezia-Tarsia
n70 Piazzale Clodio-Termini
n8 Dei Capasso-Termini 
n716 Termini-Laurentina
n3d Circular Route Piazzale Ostiense/Piramide
n3s Circular Route Piazzale Ostiense/Piramide
n5 Piazza Venezia-Togliatti/Palme
n543 Piazza Venezia-Vertunni/Salcito
n92 Termini-Sempione
n719 Roma Trastevere railway station-Candoni ATAC Depot
n98 Termini-Mazzacurati
n781 Roma Trastevere railway station-Magliana/Scarperia
n409 Roma Tiburtina railway station-Colli Albani
n11 Piazza Venezia-Grotte Celoni
n904 Piazza Venezia-Bedeschi
n705 Laurentina-Piermarini
n66 Termini-Marx
n041 Roma Tiburtina railway station-Alba Adriatica
n200 Piazza Mancini-Prima Porta Railway Station
n201 Piazza Venezia-Conti Antonio/Pullè
n500 Cinecittà-Passolombardo/Campus X
n74 Circular Route Laurentina
n075 Largo Preneste-Tonino Bello

Bus fleet

Urban buses, midbuses, and minibuses 

48-49 Tecnobus Gulliver U520 (not on route services, but operating as mobile ticket offices)
241-270 Iveco Daily Indcar Mobi
631-690 Tecnobus Gulliver U520 ESP New
701-800 Mercedes-Benz O530 C2 Citaro Hybrid (under delivery)
1301-1320 IIA Menarinibus Citymood 10
1642 Iveco 200E.9.27 Europolis
1721-1754, 1756–1778, 1780-1799 CAM Autodromo Alè (2 doors)
2001-2070 Irisbus 200E.9.13 Europolis
2101-2175 IIA Menarinibus Citymood 12 (2 doors)
2201-2241 IIA Menarinibus Citymood 12 (3 doors)
2301-2325 IIA Menarinibus Citymood 12 CNG (2 doors)
2401-2466 IIA Menarinibus Citymood 12 CNG (3 doors)
3001-3206 Irisbus Citelis 12
3301-3430, 3471-3485 Iveco Bus Urbanway 12
3721-3954 Iveco 491E.12.29 CityClass Cursor
4101-4500 Irisbus 491E.12.27 CityClass Cursor CNG
4501-4524 Irisbus Citelis 12 CNG
5001-5500 Iveco 491E.12.29 CityClass Cursor
5822-5846 Iveco Daily (5843 was converted into a mobile ticket office)
5901-6000 Iveco 491E.12.29 CityClass Cursor
7501-7618, 7620–7621, 7623, 7626–7644, 7649, 7657-7700 Mercedes-Benz O530N Citaro (3 doors)
8101-8113, 815–8128, 8130, 8132, 8151–8159, 8161-8201 Mercedes-Benz O530N Citaro (2 doors)

Trolleybuses 

These are used on Express Routes 60 (occasionally) and 90, and on Urban Route 74:

8501-8530 Solaris Ganz Trollino II 18
8601-8645 BredaMenarinibus Avancity+ S HTB

The BredaMenarinibus Avancity+ HTB were part of a controversy of misuse of public funds by the Gianni Alemanno's and Ignazio Marino's mayoral terms. In fact, they had been originally purchased in 2009 to operate into a new trolleybus line at the EUR, but had remained unused inside the Tor Pagnotta bus depot for years, before making their official debut in 2016 on routes 60 and 90 and, since 2019, on route 74.

Interurban buses and buses for private hire 

1851  DAF SB4000 Dallavia Palladio TH
6001-6183 Mercedes-Benz O530 Citaro NÜ

Urban bendy buses 

401-531 Irisbus Citelis 18 EEV
551-590 Iveco Urbanway 18

Former bus and bendy bus fleet

Purchased between 1960 and 1979 

01-80 Lancia 703.04 Pistoiesi (demolished)
101-109, 158–172, 241-275 Lancia 718.301 Esagamma Portesi (demolished)
110-118, 143-157 Lancia 718.301 Esagamma SEAC (demolished)
119-142, 173-240 Lancia 718.301 Esagamma Pistoiesi (demolished)
276-301 Lancia 718.241 Esagamma Portesi (demolished)
1600-1629, 1720-1744 Fiat 314 Portesi
no. 1605-1613 and 1725 were sold to Rossi Bus Autoservizi Roma in 1992
no. 1614, 1722 and 1736 were sold to Corsi e Pampanelli Roma in 1992
the rest were demolished
1700-1719 Fiat 314 Menarini
1705 and 1715 were sold to CAT Tivoli in 1986
1708 and 1716 were sold to SAP Guidonia in 1988
the rest were demolished
1778-1797 Fiat 414 Cansa (demolished)
2735-2967 (only odd numbers) Fiat 410 OM
no. 2745, 2779, 2791, 2803 and 2825 were sold to the Pomezia municipality in 1975 and 1976
the rest were demolished
2969-2975 (only odd numbers) Fiat 410 Viberti (demolished)
2977-2985 (only odd numbers) Fiat 410 Mater (demolished)
3001-3140 Fiat 410 Cameri (demolished)
3141-3150 Fiat 410 Piaggio (demolished)
3151-3210, 3246-3269 Fiat 410 Cansa (demolished)
3211-3245, 3270-3285 Fiat 410 Pistoiesi (demolished)
3684-3758, 4042-4178 Fiat 410 A Pistoiesi (demolished)
3759-3899, 4001-4041 Fiat 410 A Cameri (demolished)
3901-3958 Fiat 412 Aerfer Bipiano
3902 sold to AMA Roma in 1982
others were sent to Irpinia as aids for the 1980 Irpinia earthquake
another bus is currently preserved in a park with the hope of being converted into a bar
the rest were demolished
4200-4339, 4480–4599, 4800-4864 Fiat 418 AL Cameri
no. 4248, 4266 and 4290 were exported to Cuba
the rest were demolished
4340-4432, 4750-4789 Fiat 418 AL Portesi
no. 4344, 4366, 4369, 4378, 4394 and 4405 were exported to Cuba
the rest were demolished
4600-4719 Fiat 418 AL Breda (demolished)
5000-5219 Fiat 421 A Cameri
no. 5044, 5052, 5063, 5091, 5097, 5116 and 5123 were sold to CAT Tivoli in 1992
the rest were demolished
5220-5319 Fiat 421 A Menarini 
no. 5220 to 5264 were exported to Cuba
the rest were demolished
6000-6119 Fiat 421 AL Cameri
no. 6008, 6033

References

External links

 – Official website (English version)

Transport in Rome